Sivasubramaniam Raveendranath (born 22 February 1951)
is a Sri Lankan Tamil academic and the Vice-Chancellor of the Eastern University of Sri Lanka. He disappeared after attending a conference on 15 December 2006 in a high-security zone in Colombo and was last seen leaving the conference after receiving a telephone call.
His current whereabouts are unknown
and his family have claimed that they believe that he has been killed.

Disappearance
Raveendranath had been with the Eastern University of Sri Lanka since its inception but he had to give his resignation following threats and the kidnapping of Dean Dr. K. Balasukumar to the University Grants Commission (UGC) Chairman. However, the UGC asked him to work from the capital, Colombo. He moved to Colombo and lived there with his daughter. According to his son-in-law, M. Malaravan:

Prior to his disappearance, Raveendranath was attending the annual sessions of the Sri Lanka Association for the Advancement of Science at Vidya Mandiraya, which is situated in a high security zone in Colombo. He was last seen leaving the session after receiving a phone call.

Local media have reported that there are allegations that gunmen belonging to the paramilitary organisation Tamil Makkal Viduthalia Pulikal (TMVP) have kidnapped him.

Reactions
Amnesty International issued an appeal expressing concern

Robert J. Quinn Director Scholars at Risk Network issued an appeal to president Mahinda Rajapakse

The staff of the Eastern University of Sri Lanka went on strike demanding his release.

Government investigation
The Criminal Investigation Department (CID) investigation revealed that the initial threats to him came from an armed group suspected to be the TMVP. Raveendranath's driver has been detained and it is alleged that he had received telephone calls from people "believed to be" members of the TMVP. His kidnapping is seen as part of series of abductions of Tamils and are part of the "era of terror" abductions by death squads and pro government militias which were responsible for the disappearances of thousands of people since the 1980s. Human rights watch states majority of disappearances involve Sri Lankan security forces and paramilitary groups like the TMVP led by Karuna and the government response has been inadequate. 
A member of the Civil Monitoring Committee on Extra Judicial Killings, Abductions and Disappearances, Mano Ganeshan said that

See also
List of people who disappeared

References

External links
AHRC list of Disappeared people in Sri Lanka 2006 -2007

1951 births
2000s missing person cases
Enforced disappearances in Sri Lanka
Missing people
Missing person cases in Sri Lanka
Sri Lankan Tamil academics
Vice-Chancellors of the Eastern University, Sri Lanka